Tibusungu 'e Vayayana is a Taiwanese Tsou politician. He has served as the Deputy Minister of the Council of Indigenous Peoples (CIP) since 20 May 2016.

Education
Vayayana obtained his bachelor's, master's and doctoral degrees in geography from National Taiwan Normal University (NTNU).

Early career
Vayayana is an associate professor at the Department of Geography at NTNU. He heads the Indigenous Research and Development Center of the university and has helped CIP to conduct surveys on traditional tribal territories.

References

Living people
Political office-holders in the Republic of China on Taiwan
National Taiwan Normal University alumni
Tsou people
Year of birth missing (living people)